Stephen Malcolm Gillis (December 28, 1940 – October 4, 2015) was an American academic. He served as the sixth president of Rice University in Houston, Texas, from 1993 until 2004. He was University Professor and Ervin Kenneth Zingler Professor of Economics at Rice.

Biography

Education
Gillis received a Bachelor of Arts in 1962 and a Master of Arts in 1963 from the University of Florida. Later, he received a Doctor of Philosophy from the University of Illinois in 1968.   While he was a student at Florida, he became a member of the Phi Delta Theta fraternity.

Career
Prior to serving as Rice University president, Gillis was Dean of the Faculty of Arts and Sciences at Duke University (1991–1993) and Dean of the Graduate School and Vice Provost for Academic Affairs at Duke (1986–1991).

Gillis helped to found Jacobs University Bremen (initially International University Bremen) and served on the board of governors. He was one of four Co-Chairmen of Pyongyang University of Science and Technology. He is also a founding member of TanTao University in Vietnam. He sat on the Board of Directors of CRDF Global and Halliburton.

Gillis passed away from cancer on October 4, 2015.

References

External links
North Korea's Pyongyang University of Science and Technology
Biography

1940 births
2015 deaths
University of Florida alumni
Presidents of Rice University
Halliburton people